Punjab is a state in northern India. Forming part of the larger Punjab region of the Indian subcontinent, the state is bordered by the Indian states of Himachal Pradesh to the north and northeast, Haryana to the south and southeast, and Rajasthan to the southwest; by the Indian union territories of Chandigarh to the east and Jammu and Kashmir to the north. It shares an international border with Punjab, a province of Pakistan to the west. The state covers an area of 50,362 square kilometres (19,445 square miles), which is 1.53% of India's total geographical area, making it the 19th-largest Indian state by area out of 28 Indian states (20th largest, if UTs are considered). With over 27 million inhabitants, Punjab is the 16th-largest Indian state by population, comprising 23 districts. Punjabi, written in the Gurmukhi script, is the most widely spoken and the official language of the state. The main ethnic groups are the Punjabis, with Sikhs and Hindus as the dominant religious groups. The state capital is Chandigarh, a union territory and also the capital of the neighbouring state of Haryana. Three tributaries of the Indus, viz.,   Sutlej, Beas, and Ravi, flow through Punjab.

The history of Punjab has witnessed the migration and settlement of different tribes of people with different cultures and ideas, forming a melting pot of Punjabi civilisation. The Indus Valley civilization flourished in antiquity before recorded history until their decline around 1900 BCE. Punjab was enriched during the height of the Vedic period, but declined in predominance with the rise of the Mahajanapadas. The region formed the frontier of initial empires during antiquity including the Alexander's and Maurya empires. It was subsequently conquered by the Kushan Empire, Gupta Empire, and then Harsha's Empire. Punjab continued to be settled by nomadic people; including the Huna, Turkic and the Mongols. Circa 1000 CE, the Punjab came under the rule of Muslims and was part of the Delhi Sultanate, Mughal Empire, and Durrani Empire. Sikhism was founded in the 15th to 17th centuries by the Sikh Gurus in the Punjab and resulted in the formation of the Sikh Confederacy after the fall of the Mughal Empire and ensuing conflict with the Durrani Empire. This confederacy was united into the Sikh Empire in 1801 by Maharaja Ranjit Singh.

The greater Punjab region was annexed by the British East India Company from the Sikh Empire in 1849. Following widespread religious violence in 1947, the Punjab Province of British India was divided along religious lines into West Punjab and East Punjab. West Punjab became part of a Muslim-majority Pakistan, while East Punjab became part of a Hindu-majority India. After the Punjabi Suba movement, Indian Punjab was reorganised on the basis of language on 1 November 1966. Haryanvi and Hindi-speaking southern and eastern areas were carved out as Haryana, while Pahari-speaking northern hilly regions were attached to Himachal Pradesh. The remaining, mostly Punjabi-speaking areas became the current state of Punjab. A separatist insurgency occurred in Punjab during the 1980s. Since independence, Punjab is predominantly an agrarian society. It is the ninth-highest ranking among Indian states in human development index. Punjab has bustling tourism, music, culinary, and film industries.

Etymology

History

Ancient period 
The Punjab region is noted as the site of one of the earliest urban societies, the Indus Valley Civilization that flourished from about 3000 B.C. and declined rapidly 1,000 years later, following the Indo-Aryan migrations that overran the region in waves between 1500 and 500 B.C. Frequent intertribal wars stimulated the growth of larger groupings ruled by chieftains and kings, who ruled local kingdoms known as Mahajanapadas. The rise of kingdoms and dynasties in the Punjab is chronicled in the ancient Hindu epics, particularly the Mahabharata. The epic battles described in the Mahabharata are chronicled as being fought in what is now the state of Haryana and historic Punjab. The Gandharas, Kambojas, Trigartas, Andhra, Pauravas, Bahlikas (Bactrian settlers of the Punjab), Yaudheyas, and others sided with the Kauravas in the great battle fought at Kurukshetra. According to DrFauja Singh and Dr.L.M. Joshi: "There is no doubt that the Kambojas, Daradas, Kaikayas, Andhra, Pauravas, Yaudheyas, Malavas, Saindhavas, and Kurus had jointly contributed to the heroic tradition and composite culture of ancient Punjab." The bulk of the Rigveda was composed in the Punjab region between circa 1500 and 1200 BC, while later Vedic scriptures were composed more eastwards, between the Yamuna and Ganges rivers. The historical Vedic religion constituted the religious ideas and practices in the Punjab during the Vedic period (1500–500 BCE), centred primarily in the worship of Indra.

The earliest known notable local king of this region  was known as King Porus, who fought the famous Battle of the Hydaspes against Alexander the Great. His kingdom spanned between rivers Hydaspes (Jhelum) and Acesines (Chenab); Strabo had held the territory to contain almost 300 cities. He (alongside Abisares) had a hostile relationship with the Kingdom of Taxila which was ruled by his extended family. When the armies of Alexander crossed Indus in its eastward migration, probably in Udabhandapura, he was greeted by the-then ruler of Taxila, Omphis. Omphis had hoped to force both Porus and Abisares into submission leveraging the might of Alexander's forces and diplomatic missions were mounted, but while Abisares accepted the submission, Porus refused. This led Alexander to seek a face-off with Porus. Thus began the Battle of the Hydaspes in 326 BC; the exact site remains unknown. The battle is thought to have resulted in a decisive Greek victory; however, A. B. Bosworth warns against an uncritical reading of Greek sources who were obviously exaggerative.

Alexander later founded two cities—Nicaea at the site of victory and Bucephalous at the battle-ground, in memory of his horse, who died soon after the battle. Later, tetradrachms would be minted depicting Alexander on horseback, armed with a sarissa and attacking a pair of Indians on an elephant. Porus refused to surrender and wandered about atop an elephant, until he was wounded and his force routed. When asked by Alexander how he wished to be treated, Porus replied "Treat me as a king would treat another king". Despite the apparently one-sided results, Alexander was impressed by Porus and chose to not depose him. Not only was his territory reinstated but also expanded with Alexander's forces annexing the territories of Glausaes, who ruled the area northeast of Porus' kingdom.

After Alexander's death in 323 BCE, Perdiccas became the regent of his empire, and after Perdiccas's murder in 321 BCE, Antipater became the new regent. According to Diodorus, Antipater recognized Porus's authority over the territories along the Indus River. However, Eudemus, who had served as Alexander's satrap in the Punjab region, treacherously killed Porus. The battle is historically significant because it resulted in the syncretism of ancient Greek political and cultural influences to the Indian subcontinent, yielding works such as Greco-Buddhist art, which continued to have an impact for the ensuing centuries. The region was then divided between the Maurya Empire and the Greco-Bactrian kingdom in 302 B.C.E. Menander I Soter conquered Punjab and made Sagala (present-day Sialkot) the capital of the Indo-Greek Kingdom. Menander is noted for having become a patron and convert to Greco-Buddhism and he is widely regarded as the greatest of the Indo-Greek kings. Greek influence in the region ended around 12 B.C.E. when the Punjab fell under the Sassanids.

Medieval period 
Following the muslim conquests in the Indian subcontinent at the beginning of the 8th century, Arab armies of the Umayyad Caliphate penetrated into South Asia introducing Islam into Punjab. In the ninth century, the Hindu Shahi dynasty emerged in the Punjab, ruling much of Punjab and eastern Afghanistan. The Turkic Ghaznavids in the tenth century overthrew the Hindu Shahis and consequently ruled for 157 years, gradually declining as a power until the Ghurid conquest of Lahore by Muhammad of Ghor in 1186, deposing the last Ghaznavid ruler Khusrau Malik. Following the death of Muhammad of Ghor in 1206, the Ghurid state fragmented and was replaced in northern India by the Delhi Sultanate. The Delhi Sultanate ruled the Punjab for the next three hundred years, led by five unrelated dynasties, the Mamluks, Khalajis, Tughlaqs, Sayyids and Lodis. A significant event in the late 15th century Punjab was the formation of Sikhism by Guru Nanak. The history of the Sikh faith is closely associated with the history of Punjab and the socio-political situation in the north-west of the Indian subcontinent in the 17th century. 

The hymns composed by Guru Nanak were later collected in the Guru Granth Sahib, the central religious scripture of the Sikhs. The religion developed and evolved in times of religious persecution, gaining converts from both Hinduism and Islam. Mughal rulers of India tortured and executed two of the Sikh gurus—Guru Arjan (1563–1605) and Guru Tegh Bahadur (1621–1675)—after they refused to convert to Islam. The persecution of Sikhs triggered the founding of the Khalsa by Guru Gobind Singh in 1699 as an order to protect the freedom of conscience and religion, with members expressing the qualities of a Sant-Sipāhī ('saint-soldier'). The lifetime of Guru Nanak coincided with the conquest of northern India by Babur and establishment of the Mughal Empire. Jahangir ordered the execution of Guru Arjun Dev, whilst in Mughal custody, for supporting his son Khusrau Mirza's rival claim to the throne. Guru Arjan Dev's death led to the sixth Guru Guru Hargobind to declare sovereignty in the creation of the Akal Takht and the establishment of a fort to defend Amritsar. Jahangir then jailed Guru Hargobind at Gwalior, but released him after a number of years when he no longer felt threatened. The succeeding son of Jahangir, Shah Jahan, took offence at Guru Hargobind's declaration and after a series of assaults on Amritsar, forced the Sikhs to retreat to the Sivalik Hills. The ninth Guru, Guru Tegh Bahadur, moved the Sikh community to Anandpur and travelled extensively to visit and preach in defiance of Aurangzeb, who attempted to install Ram Rai as new guru.

Modern period 
The Mughals came to power in the early sixteenth century and gradually expanded to control all of the Punjab from their capital at Lahore. As Mughal power weakened, Afghan rulers took control of the region. Contested by Marathas and Afghans, the region was the center of the growing influence of the Sikhs, who expanded and established the Sikh empire in 1799 as the Mughals and Afghans weakened. The Cis-Sutlej states were a group of states in modern Punjab and Haryana states lying between the Sutlej River on the north, the Himalayas on the east, the Yamuna River and Delhi District on the south, and Sirsa District on the west. These states were ruled by the Sikh Misls. The empire existed from 1799, when Ranjit Singh captured Lahore, to 1849, when it was defeated and conquered in the Second Anglo-Sikh War. It was forged on the foundations of the Khalsa from a collection of autonomous Sikh misls. At its peak in the 19th century, the Empire extended from the Khyber Pass in the west to western Tibet in the east, and from Mithankot in the south to Kashmir in the north. It was divided into four provinces: Lahore, in Punjab, which became the Sikh capital; Multan, also in Punjab; Peshawar; and Kashmir from 1799 to 1849. Religiously diverse, with an estimated population of 3.5 million in 1831 (making it the 19th most populous country at the time), it was the last major region of the Indian subcontinent to be annexed by the British Empire.

After Ranjit Singh's death in 1839, the empire was severely weakened by internal divisions and political mismanagement. This opportunity was used by the East India Company to launch the First and Second Anglo-Sikh Wars. The country was finally annexed and dissolved at the end of the Second Anglo-Sikh War in 1849 into separate princely states and the province of Punjab. Eventually, a Lieutenant Governorship was established in Lahore as a direct representative of the Crown.

Colonial era 

The Punjab was annexed by the East India Company in 1849.  Although nominally part of the Bengal Presidency it was administratively independent. During the Indian Rebellion of 1857, apart from Revolt led by Ahmed Khan Kharal and Murree rebellion of 1857, the Punjab remained relatively peaceful. In 1858, under the terms of the Queen's Proclamation issued by Queen Victoria, the Punjab came under the direct rule of Britain. Colonial rule had a profound impact on all areas of Punjabi life. Economically it transformed the Punjab into the richest farming area of India, socially it sustained the power of large landowners and politically it encouraged cross-communal co-operation amongst land owning groups. The Punjab also became the major centre of recruitment into the Indian Army. By patronising influential local allies and focusing administrative, economic and constitutional policies on the rural population, the British ensured the loyalty of its large rural population. Administratively, colonial rule instated a system of bureaucracy and measure of the law. The 'paternal' system of the ruling elite was replaced by 'machine rule' with a system of laws, codes, and procedures. For purposes of control, the British established new forms of communication and transportation, including post systems, railways, roads, and telegraphs. The creation of Canal Colonies in western Punjab between 1860 and 1947 brought 14 million acres of land under cultivation, and revolutionised agricultural practices in the region. To the agrarian and commercial class was added a professional middle class that had risen the social ladder through the use of the English education, which opened up new professions in law, government, and medicine. Despite these developments, colonial rule was marked by exploitation of resources. For the purpose of exports, the majority of external trade was controlled by British export banks. The Imperial government exercised control over the finances of Punjab and took the majority of the income for itself.

In 1919 a British officer ordered his troops to fire on a crowd of demonstrators, mostly Sikhs in Amritsar. The Jallianwala massacre fueled the indian independence movement. Nationalists declared the independence of India from Lahore in 1930 but were quickly suppressed. The struggle for Indian independence witnessed competing and conflicting interests in the Punjab. When the Second World War broke out, nationalism in British India had already divided into religious movements. The landed elites of the Muslim, Hindu and Sikh communities had loyally collaborated with the British since annexation, supported the Unionist Party and were hostile to the Congress party led independence movement. Amongst the peasantry and urban middle classes, the Hindus were the most active National Congress supporters, the Sikhs flocked to the Akali movement whilst the Muslims eventually supported the Muslim League. Many Sikhs and other minorities supported the Hindus, who promised a secular multicultural and multireligious society. In March 1940, the All-India Muslim League passed the Lahore Resolution, demanding the creation of a separate state from Muslim majority areas in British India. This triggered bitter protests by the Hindus and Sikhs in Punjab, who could not accept living in a Muslim Islamic state.

After the partition of the sub-continent had been decided, special meetings of the Western and Eastern Section of the Legislative Assembly were held on 23 June 1947 to decide whether or not the Province of the Punjab be partitioned. After voting on both sides, partition was decided and the existing Punjab Legislative Assembly was also divided into West Punjab Legislative Assembly and the East Punjab Legislative Assembly. This last Assembly before independence, held its last sitting on 4 July 1947. During this period, the British granted separate independence to India and Pakistan, setting off massive communal violence as Punjabi Muslims fled to Pakistan and Hindu and Sikh Punjabis fled east to India. The Sikhs later demanded a Punjabi-speaking Punjab state with an autonomous Sikh government.

Post-colonial era 
During the colonial era, the various districts and princely states that made up Punjab Province were religiously eclectic, each containing significant populations of Punjabi Muslims, Punjabi Hindus, Punjabi Sikhs, Punjabi Christians, along with other ethnic and religious minorities. However, a major consequence of independence and the partition of Punjab Province in 1947 was the sudden shift towards religious homogeneity occurred in all districts across province and region owing to the new international border that cut through the subdivision.

The demographic shift was captured when comparing decadal census data taken in 1941 and 1951 respectively, and was primarily due to wide scale migration but also caused by large-scale religious cleansing riots which were witnessed across the region at the time. According to historical demographer Tim Dyson, in the eastern regions of Punjab that ultimately became Indian Punjab following independence, districts that were 66% Hindu in 1941 became 80% Hindu in 1951; those that were 20% Sikh became 50% Sikh in 1951. Conversely, in the western regions of Punjab that ultimately became Pakistani Punjab, all districts became almost exclusively Muslim by 1951.

Following independence, several small Punjabi princely states, including Patiala, acceded to the Union of India and were united into the PEPSU. In 1956 this was integrated with the state of East Punjab to create a new, enlarged Indian state called simply "Punjab". Punjab Day is celebrated across the state on 1 November every year marking the formation of a Punjabi language speaking state under the Punjab Reorganisation Act (1966).

In 1966, following Hindu and Sikh Punjabi demands, the Indian government divided Punjab into the state of Punjab and the Hindi majority-speaking states of Haryana and Himachal Pradesh.  

From 1981 to 1995 the state suffered a 14-year-long insurgency. Problems began due to disputes between Punjabi Sikhs and the central government of the Republic of India. Tensions escalated throughout the early 1980s and eventually culminated with Operation Blue Star in 1984; an Indian Army operation aimed at the dissident Sikh community of Punjab. Shortly thereafter, Indian Prime Minister Indira Gandhi was assassinated by two of her Sikh bodyguards. The decade that followed was noted for widespread inter-communal violence and accusations of genocide on the part of the Sikh community by the Indian government.

Geography
Punjab is bordered by Pakistan's Punjab province on the west, Jammu and Kashmir on the north, Himachal Pradesh on the northeast and Haryana and Rajasthan on the south. Most of Punjab lies in a fertile, alluvial plain with perennial rivers and an extensive irrigation canal system. A belt of undulating hills extends along the northeastern part of the state at the foot of the Himalayas. The southwest of the state is semi-arid, eventually merging into the Thar Desert. Of the five Punjab rivers, three—Sutlej, Beas and Ravi—flow through the Indian state. The Sutlej and Ravi define parts of the international border with Pakistan.

The soil characteristics are influenced to a limited extent by the topography, vegetation and parent rock. The variation in soil profile characteristics are much more pronounced because of the regional climatic differences. Punjab is divided into three distinct regions on the basis of soil types: southwestern, central, and eastern. Punjab falls under seismic zones II, III, and IV. Zone II is considered a low-damage risk zone; zone III is considered a moderate-damage risk zone; and zone IV is considered a high-damage risk zone.

Climate

The geography and subtropical latitudinal location of Punjab lead to large variations in temperature from month to month. Even though only limited regions experience temperatures below , ground frost is commonly found in the majority of Punjab during the winter season. The temperature rises gradually with high humidity and overcast skies. However, the rise in temperature is steep when the sky is clear and humidity is low.

The maximum temperatures usually occur in mid-May and June. The temperature remains above  in the entire region during this period. The maximum temperature during the summer in Ludhiana remains above  for a duration of one and a half months. These areas experience the lowest temperatures in January. The sun rays are oblique during these months and the cold winds control the temperature at daytime.

Punjab experiences its minimum temperature from December to February. The minimum temperature of the region remains below  for almost two months during the winter season. The highest minimum temperature of these regions in June is more than the daytime maximum temperatures experienced in January and February. Ludhiana experiences minimum temperatures above  for more than two months.

Seasons
Punjab experiences three main seasons. They are:
Summer (mid-April to the end of June)
Monsoon (early July to the end of September)
Winter (early December to the end of February).

Apart from these three, the state experiences transitional seasons like:
Pre-summer season (March to mid-April): This is the period of transition between winter and summer.
Post-monsoon season (September to end of November): This is the period of transition between monsoon and winter seasons.

Summer
Punjab starts experiencing mildly hot temperatures in February. The actual summer season commences in mid-April and the heat continues till the end of August. High temperatures between May and August hover between 40 and 47 °C. The area experiences atmospheric pressure variations during the summer months. The atmospheric pressure of the region remains around 987 millibar during February and it reaches 970 millibar in June.

Monsoon
Punjab's rainy season begins in the first week of July as monsoon currents generated in the Bay of Bengal bring rain to the region. The monsoon lasts up to mid-September.

Winter
Temperature variation is minimal in January.

Post-Monsoon transitional season
The monsoon begins to reduce by the second week of September. This brings a gradual change in climate and temperature. The time between October and November is the transitional period between monsoon and winter seasons. Weather during this period is generally temperate and dry.

Post-Winter transitional season
The effects of winter diminish by the first week of March. The hot summer season commences in mid-April. This period is marked by occasional showers with hail storms and squalls that cause extensive damage to crops. The winds remain dry and warm during the last week of March, commencing the harvest period.

Rainfall
Monsoon Rainfall
Monsoon season provides most of the rainfall for the region. Punjab receives rainfall from the monsoon current of the Bay of Bengal. This monsoon current enters the state from the southeast in the first week of July.

Winter Rainfall
The winter season remains very cool with temperatures falling below freezing at some places. Winter also brings in some western disturbances. Rainfall in the winter provides relief to the farmers as some of the winter crops in the region of Shivalik Hills are entirely dependent on this rainfall.

Flora and fauna

The fauna of the area is rich, with 396 types of birds, 214 kinds of Lepidoptera, 55 varieties of fish, 20 types of reptiles, and 19 kinds of mammals. The state of Punjab has large wetland areas, bird sanctuaries that house numerous species of birds, and many zoological parks. Wetlands include the national wetland Hari-Ke-Pattan, the wetland of Kanjli, and the wetlands of Kapurthala Sutlej. Wildlife sanctuaries include the Harike in the district of Tarn Taran Sahib, the Zoological Park in Rupnagar, Chhatbir Bansar Garden in Sangrur, Aam Khas Bagh in Sirhind, Amritsar's famous Ram Bagh Palace, Shalimar Garden in Kapurthala, and the famous Baradari Garden in the city of Patiala.

Animals
A few of the rivers in Punjab have crocodiles. The extraction of silk from silkworms is another industry that flourishes in the state. Production of bee honey is done in some parts of Punjab. The southern plains are desert land; hence, camels can be seen. Buffaloes graze around the banks of rivers. The northeastern part is home to animals like horses. Wildlife sanctuaries have many more species of wild animals like the otter, wild boar, wildcat, fruit bat, hog deer, flying fox, squirrel, and mongoose. Naturally formed forests can be seen in the Shivalik ranges in the districts of Ropar, Gurdaspur and Hoshiarpur. Patiala is home to the Bir forest while the wetlands area in Punjab is home to the Mand forest. The local subspecies of blackbuck, A. c. rajputanae, is facing the risk of extirpation from the state.

Botanical gardens exist throughout Punjab. There is a zoological park and a tiger safari park, as well as three parks dedicated to deer.

The state bird is the northern goshawk (baz) (Accipiter gentilis), the state animal is the blackbuck (Antilope cervicapra), the state aquatic animal is Indus river dolphin (Platanista minor), and the state tree is the shisham (Dalbergia sissoo).

Government and politics

Punjab is governed through a parliamentary system of representative democracy. Each of the states of India possesses a parliamentary system of government, with a ceremonial state Governor, appointed by the President of India on the advice of the central government. The head of government is an indirectly elected Chief Minister who is vested with most of the executive powers. The term length of the government is five years. The state legislature, the Vidhan Sabha, is the unicameral Punjab Legislative Assembly, with 117 members elected from single-seat constituencies. The current government was elected in the 2022 Assembly elections as Aam Aadmi Party won 92 out of 117 Assembly seats and Bhagwant Mann is the current Chief Minister. The state of Punjab is divided into five administrative divisions and twenty-three districts.

The capital of Punjab is Chandigarh, which also serves as the capital of Haryana and is thus administered separately as a Union Territory of India. The judicial branch of the state government is provided by the Punjab and Haryana High Court in Chandigarh.

The three major political parties in the state are the Aam Aadmi Party, a centrist to left wing party, the Shiromani Akali Dal, a Sikh right-wing Punjabiyat party and the Indian National Congress, a centrist catch all party. President's rule has been imposed in Punjab eight times so far, since 1950, for different reasons. In terms of the absolute number of days, Punjab was under the President's rule for 3,510 days, which is approximately 10 years. Much of this was in the 80s during the height of militancy in Punjab. Punjab was under the President's rule for five continuous years from 1987 to 1992.

Punjab state law and order is maintained by Punjab Police. Punjab police is headed by its DGP, Dinkar Gupta, and has 70,000 employees. It manages state affairs through 22 district heads known as SSP.

Administrative set-up

Punjab has 23 districts, which are geographically classified into Majha, Malwa, Doaba and Puadh regions, as under: -

Majha (4)
Amritsar
Gurdaspur
Pathankot
Tarn Taran
Doaba (4)
Hoshiarpur
Jalandhar
Kapurthala
Shaheed Bhagat Singh Nagar
Malwa (12)
Barnala
Bathinda
Ferozepur
Fazilka
Faridkot
Ludhiana
Moga
Malerkotla
Mansa
Sri Muktsar Sahib 
Patiala
Sangrur
Puadh (3)
SAS Nagar (Mohali)
Rupnagar
Fatehgarh Sahib

These districts are officially divided among 5 administrative divisions: Faridkot, Ferozepur, Jalandhar, Patiala and Ropar(created on 31 December 2010, which was a part of Patiala Division earlier).

Each district is under the administrative control of a District Collector. The districts are subdivided into 93 tehsils, which have fiscal and administrative powers over settlements within their borders, including maintenance of local land records comes under the administrative control of a Tehsildar. Each Tehsil consists of blocks which are total 150 in number. These blocks consist of revenue villages. There are total number of revenue villages in the state is 12,278. There are 23 Zila Parishads, 136 Municipal Committees and 22 Improvement Trusts looking after 143 towns and 14 cities of Punjab.

The capital city of the state is Chandigarh and largest city of the state is Ludhiana. Out of total population of Punjab, 37.48% people live in urban regions. The absolute urban population living in urban areas is 10,399,146 of which 5,545,989 are males and while remaining 4,853,157 are females. The urban population in the last 10 years has increased by 37.48%. The major cities are Ludhiana, Amritsar, Jalandhar, Mohali, Patiala and Bathinda.

Economy

Punjab is one of the most fertile regions in India. The region is ideal for wheat-growing. Rice, sugar cane, fruits and vegetables are also grown. Indian Punjab is called the "Granary of India" or "India's bread-basket". It produces 10.26% of India's cotton, 19.5% of India's wheat, and 11% of India's rice. The Firozpur and Fazilka Districts are the largest producers of wheat and rice in the state. In worldwide terms, Indian Punjab produces 2% of the world's cotton, 2% of its wheat and 1% of its rice.

Punjab ranked first in GDP per capita amongst Indian states in 1981 and fourth in 2001, but has experienced slower growth than the rest of India, having the second-slowest GDP per capita growth rate of all Indian states and UTs between 2000 and 2010, behind only Manipur.

Agriculture 
Punjab's economy has been primarily agriculture-based since the Green Revolution due to the presence of abundant water sources and fertile soils; most of the state lies in a fertile alluvial plain with many rivers and an extensive irrigation canal system. The largest cultivated crop is wheat. Other important crops are rice, cotton, sugarcane, pearl millet, maize, barley and fruit. Rice and wheat are doublecropped in Punjab with rice stalks being burned off over millions of acres prior to the planting of wheat. This widespread practice is polluting and wasteful. Despite covering only 1.53% of its geographical area, Punjab makes up for about 15-20% of India's wheat production, around 12% of its rice production, and around 5% of its milk production, being known as India's breadbasket. About 80%-95% of Punjab's agricultural land is owned by its Jat Sikh community despite it only forming 21% of the state's population. About 10% of Punjab's population is made up of migrants from poorer states to the southeast such as Uttar Pradesh and Bihar who work as farm labourers.

Other major industries include financial services, the manufacturing of scientific instruments, agricultural goods, electrical goods, machine tools, textiles, sewing machines, sports goods, starch, fertilisers, bicycles, garments, and the processing of pine oil and sugar. Minerals and energy resources also contribute to Punjab's economy to a much lesser extent. Punjab has the largest number of steel rolling mill plants in India, which are in "Steel Town"—Mandi Gobindgarh in the Fatehgarh Sahib district. Punjab also has a large diaspora that is mostly settled in the United Kingdom, the United States, and Canada, numbers about 3 million, and sends back billions of USD in remittances to the state, playing a major role in its economy.

In Punjab the consumption of fertiliser per hectare is 223.46 kg as compared to 90 kg nationally. The state has been awarded the National Productivity Award for agriculture extension services for ten years, from 1991 to 1992 to 1998–99 and from 2001 to 2003–04. In recent years a drop in productivity has been observed, mainly due to falling fertility of the soil. This is believed to be due to excessive use of fertilisers and pesticides over the years. Another worry is the rapidly falling water table on which almost 90% of the agriculture depends; alarming drops have been witnessed in recent years. By some estimates, groundwater is falling by a meter or more per year.

According to the India State Hunger Index, Punjab has the lowest level of hunger in India.

Transport

Air 

Sri Guru Ram Dass Jee International Airport in Amritsar, is the Primary Hub Airport and Gateway to Punjab, as the airport serves direct connectivity to key cities around the world, including London, Singapore, Moscow, Dubai, Birmingham among others.

Punjab has six civil airports including two international airports: Amritsar International Airport and Chandigarh International Airport at Mohali; and four domestic airports: Bathinda Airport, Pathankot Airport, Adampur Airport (Jalandhar) and Sahnewal Airport (Ludhiana). Apart from these 6 airports, there are 2 airfields at Beas (Amritsar) and Patiala which do not serve any commercial flight operations, as of now.

Railways 

The Indian Railways' Northern Railway line runs through the state connecting most of the major towns and cities. The Shatabdi Express, India's fastest series of train connects Amritsar to New Delhi covering total distance of 449 km. Amritsar Junction Railway Station is the busiest junction of the state. Bathinda Junction holds the record of maximum railway lines from a railway junction in Asia. Punjab's major railway stations are Amritsar Junction (ASR), Ludhiana Junction (LDH), Jalandhar Cantonment (JRC), Firozpur Cantonment (FZR), Jalandhar City Junction (JUC), Pathankot Junction (PTK) and Patiala railway station (PTA). The railway stations of Amritsar is included in the Indian Railways list of 50 world-class railway stations.

Hyperloop
Punjab Government have signed a MoU ( Memorendum of Understanding) with Virgin Hyperloop One to explore the feasibility of running a Hyperloop between Amritsar and Chandigarh which could decrease the travel time between 2 cities from five hours by road to less than 30 minutes. It will have stops in Ludhiana and Jalandhar.

Roads 

All the cities and towns of Punjab are connected by four-lane national highways. The Grand Trunk Road, also known as "NH1", connects Kolkata to Peshawar, passing through Amritsar and Jalandhar. 
National highways passing through the state are ranked the best in the country with widespread road networks that serve isolated towns as well as the border region. Amritsar and Ludhiana are among several Indian cities that have the highest accident rates in India.

The following expressways will pass through Punjab:

 Delhi-Amritsar-Katra Expressway from Delhi to Katra (National Expressway 5)
 Amritsar-Jamnagar Expressway from Amritsar to Jamnagar
 Pathankot-Ajmer Expressway from Pathankot to Ajmer

The following national highways connect major towns, cities and villages:

 National Highway 1
 National Highway 10
 National Highway 15
 National Highway 1A
 National Highway 54
 National Highway 20
 National Highway 21
 National Highway 22
 National Highway 64
 National Highway 70
 National Highway 71
 National Highway 95

Urban Rapid Transit System 
There are also a bus rapid transit system Amritsar BRTS in the holy city of Amritsar, popularly known as 'Amritsar MetroBus'

Demographics

Punjab is home to 2.3% of India's population; with a density of 551 persons per km2. According to the provisional results of the 2011 national census, Punjab has a population of 27,743,338, making it the 16th most populated state in India. Of which male and female are 14,639,465 and 13,103,873 respectively. 32% of Punjab's population consists of Dalits. In the state, the rate of population growth is 13.9% (2011), lower than national average. Out of total population, 37.5% people live in urban regions. The total figure of population living in urban areas is 10,399,146 of which 5,545,989 are males and while remaining 4,853,157 are females. The urban population in the last 10 years has increased by 37.5%.

Punjabi is the sole official language of Punjab and as of the 2011 census, is spoken as a first language by  million people, or roughly 90% of the state's population. Hindi is natively spoken by  million, or 7.9% of the population, Bagri has  speakers (or 0.8%), while the remaining  (or 1.5%) spoke other languages.

The 2011 Census of India found Scheduled Castes to account for 31.9% of the state's population. The Other Backward Classes have 31.3% population in Punjab. The exact population of Forward castes is not known as their data from Socio Economic and Caste Census 2011 is not made public as of 2019.

There has been a constant decline in the sex ratio of the state. The sex ratio in Punjab was 895 females per 1000 males, which was below the national average of 940. The literacy rate rose to 75.8% as per 2011 population census. Of that, male literacy stands at 80.4% while female literacy is at 70.7%. In actual numbers, total literates in Punjab stands at 18,707,137 of which males were 10,436,056 and females were 8,271,081.

Religion

Punjab has the largest population of Sikhs in India and is the only state where Sikhs form a majority, numbering around 16 million forming 57.7% of the state population. Hinduism is the second largest religion in the Indian state of Punjab numbering around 10.68 million and forming 38.5% of the state's population and a majority in Doaba region. Islam is followed by 535,489 accounting 1.9% of the population and are mainly concentrated in Malerkotla and Qadian. Other smaller segments of religions existing in Punjab are Christianity practised by 1.3%, Jainism practised by 0.2%, Buddhism practised by 0.1% and others 0.3%. Sikhs form a majority in 17 districts out of the total 23 districts while Hindus form the majority in 5 districts namely, Pathankot, Jalandhar, Hoshiarpur, Fazilka and Shaheed Bhagat Singh Nagar districts.

The Sikh shrine, Golden Temple (Harmandir Sahib), is in the city of Amritsar, which houses the Shiromani Gurdwara Parbandhak Committee, the topmost Sikh religious body. The Sri Akal Takht Sahib, which is within the Golden Temple complex, is the highest temporal seat of Sikhs. Of the five Takhts (Temporal Seats of religious authority) of Sikhism, three are in Punjab. These are Sri Akal Takht Sahib, Damdama Sahib and Anandpur Sahib. At least one Sikh Gurdwara can be found in almost every village in the state, as well as in the towns and cities (in various architectural styles and sizes). 

Hindu Mandirs can be found all over Punjab with the Shri Durgiana Mandir in Amritsar, and the Shri Devi Talab Mandir in Jalandhar visited by many pilgrims every year. Due to the open nature of their religion, a segment of Punjabis who are Punjabi Hindus continue heterogeneous religious practices in spiritual kinship with Sikhism. This not only includes veneration of the Sikh Gurus in private practice but also visit to Sikh Gurdwaras in addition to Hindu Mandirs.

Education

Primary and Secondary education is mainly affiliated to Punjab School Education Board. Punjab is served by several institutions of higher education, including 23 universities that provide undergraduate and postgraduate courses in all the major arts, humanities, science, engineering, law, medicine, veterinary science, and business. Reading and writing Punjabi language is compulsory till matriculation for every student failing which the schools attract fine or cancellation of licence.

Punjab Agricultural University is a leading institution globally for the study of agriculture and played a significant role in Punjab's Green Revolution in the 1960s–70s. Alumni of the Panjab University, Chandigarh include Manmohan Singh, the former Prime Minister of India, and Dr. Har Gobind Khorana, a biochemistry nobel laureate. One of the oldest institutions of medical education is the Christian Medical College, Ludhiana, which has existed since 1894. There is an existing gap in education between men and women, particularly in rural areas of Punjab. Of a total of 1 million 300 thousand students enrolled in grades five to eight, only 44% are women.

Punjab has 23 universities, of which ten are private, 9 are state, one is central and three are deemed universities. Punjab has 104,000 (104,000) engineering seats.

Punjab is also increasingly becoming known for education of yoga and naturopathy, with its student slowly adopting these as their career. The Board of Naturopathy and Yoga Science (BNYS) is located in the state. Regional College Dinanagar is the first college to be opened in Dinanagar Town.

Media

Daily Ajit, Jagbani and Punjabi Tribune are the largest-selling Punjabi newspapers while The Tribune is most selling English newspaper. A vast number of weekly, biweekly and monthly magazines are under publication in Punjabi. Other main newspapers are Daily Punjab Times, Rozana Spokesman, Nawan Zamana, etc.

Doordarshan is the broadcaster of the Government of India and its channel DD Punjabi is dedicated to Punjabi. Prominent private Punjabi channels include news channels like BBC Punjabi, ABP Sanjha, Global Punjab TV, News18 Punjab-Haryana-Himachal, Zee Punjab Haryana Himachal, PTC News and entertainment channels like Zee Punjabi, GET Punjabi, ETC Punjabi, Chardikla Time TV, PTC Punjabi, Colours Punjabi, JUS Punjabi, MH1 and 9x Tashan.

Punjab has witnessed a growth in FM radio channels, mainly in the cities of Jalandhar, Patiala and Amritsar, which has become hugely popular. There are government radio channels like All India Radio, Jalandhar, All India Radio, Bathinda and FM Gold Ludhiana. Private radio channels include Radio Mirchi, BIG FM 92.7, 94.3 My FM, Radio Mantra and many more.

Culture

The culture of Punjab has many elements including music such as bhangra, an extensive religious and non-religious dance tradition, a long history of poetry in the Punjabi language, a significant Punjabi film industry that dates back to before Partition, a vast range of cuisine, which has become widely popular abroad, and a number of seasonal and harvest festivals such as Lohri, Basant, Vaisakhi and Teeyan, all of which are celebrated in addition to the religious festivals of India.

A kissa is a Punjabi language oral story-telling tradition that has a mixture of origins ranging from the Arabian peninsula to Iran and Afghanistan.

Punjabi wedding traditions and ceremonies are a strong reflection of Punjabi culture. Marriage ceremonies are known for their rich rituals, songs, dances, food and dresses, which have evolved over many centuries.

Bhangra

Bhangra (pronounced ) and Giddha are forms of dance and music that originated in the Punjab region.

Bhangra dance began as a folk dance conducted by Punjabi farmers to celebrate the coming of the harvest season. The specific moves of Bhangra reflect the manner in which villagers farmed their land. This hybrid dance became Bhangra. The folk dance has been popularised in the western world by Punjabis in England, Canada and the USA where competitions are held. It is seen in the West as an expression of South Asian culture as a whole. Today, Bhangra dance survives in different forms and styles all over the globe – including pop music, film soundtracks, collegiate competitions and cultural shows.

Punjabi folklore

The folk heritage of the Punjab reflects its thousands of years of history. While Majhi is considered to be the standard dialect of Punjabi language, there are a number of Punjabi dialects through which the people communicate. These include Malwai, Doabi and Puadhi. The songs, ballads, epics and romances are generally written and sung in these dialects.

There are a number of folk tales that are popular in Punjab. These are the folk tales of Mirza Sahiban, Heer Ranjha, Sohni Mahiwal, Sassi Punnun, Jagga Jatt, Dulla Bhatti, Puran Bhagat, Jeona Maud etc.
The mystic folk songs and religious songs include the Shalooks of Sikh gurus, Baba Farid and others.

The most famous of the romantic love songs are Mayhiah, Dhola and Boliyan. Punjabi romantic dances include Dhamaal, Bhangra, Giddha, Dhola, and Sammi and some other local folk dances.

Literature

Most early Punjabi literary works are in verse form, with prose not becoming more common until later periods. Throughout its history, Punjabi literature has sought to inform and inspire, educate and entertain. The Punjabi language is written in several different scripts, of which the Shahmukhi, the Gurmukhī scripts are the most commonly used.

Music

Punjabi Folk Music is the traditional music on the traditional musical instruments of Punjab region.

Bhangra music of Punjab is famous throughout the world.

Punjabi music has a diverse style of music, ranging from folk and Sufi to classical, notably the Punjab gharana and Patiala gharana.

Film industry

Punjab is home to the Punjabi film industry, often colloquially referred to as 'Pollywood'. It is known for being the fastest growing film industry in India. It is based mainly around Mohali city. According to MP Manish Tewari, the government is planning to build a film city in Mohali.

The first Punjabi film was made in 1936. Since the 2000s Punjabi cinema has seen a revival with more releases every year with bigger budgets, homegrown stars, and Bollywood actors of Punjabi descent taking part.

Crafts 
The city of Amritsar is home to the craft of brass and copper metalwork done by the Thatheras of Jandiala Guru, which is enlisted on the UNESCO's List of Intangible Cultural Heritage. Years of neglect had caused this craft to die out, and the listing prompted the Government of Punjab to undertake a craft revival effort under Project Virasat.

Cuisine

One of the main features of Punjabi cuisine is its diverse range of dishes. Home cooked and restaurant cuisine sometimes vary in taste. Restaurant style uses large amounts of ghee. Some food items are eaten on a daily basis while some delicacies are cooked only on special occasions.

There are many regional dishes that are famous in some regions only. Many dishes are exclusive to Punjab, including Sarson Da Saag, Tandoori chicken, Shami kebab, makki di roti, etc.

Festivals and traditions

Punjabis celebrate a number of festivals, which have taken a semi-secular meaning and are regarded as cultural festivals by people of all religions. Some of the festivals are Bandi Chhor Divas (Diwali), Mela Maghi, Hola Mohalla, Rakhri, Vaisakhi, Lohri, Gurpurb, Guru Ravidass Jayanti, Teeyan and Basant Kite Festival.

Sports

Kabbadi (Circle Style), a team contact sport originated in rural Punjab is recognised as the state game. Field hockey is also a popular sport in the state. Kila Raipur Sports Festival, popularly known as the Rural Olympics, is held annually in Kila Raipur (near Ludhiana). Competition is held for major Punjabi rural sports, include cart-race, rope pulling. Punjab government organises World Kabaddi League,

Punjab Games and annual Kabaddi World Cup for Circle Style Kabbadi in which teams from countries like Argentina, Canada, Denmark, England, India, Iran, Kenya, Pakistan, Scotland, Sierra Leone, Spain and United States participated. A major C.B.S.E event C.B.S.E Cluster Athlectics also held in Punjab at Sant Baba Bhag Singh University.

The Punjab state basketball team won the National Basketball Championship on many occasions, most recently in 2019 and 2020.

Tourism

Tourism in Indian Punjab centres around the historic palaces, battle sites, and the great Sikh architecture of the state and the surrounding region. Examples include various sites of the Indus Valley civilization, the ancient fort of Bathinda, the architectural monuments of Kapurthala, Patiala, and Chandigarh, the modern capital designed by Le Corbusier.

The Golden Temple in Amritsar is one of the major tourist destinations of Punjab and indeed India, attracting more visitors than the Taj Mahal. Lonely Planet Bluelist 2008 has voted the Harmandir Sahib as one of the world's best spiritual sites. Moreover, there is a rapidly expanding array of international hotels in the holy city at Heritage Walk Amritsar that can be booked for overnight stays. Devi Talab Mandir is a Hindu temple located in Jalandhar. This temple is devoted to Goddess Durga and is believed to be at least 200 years old. Another main tourist destination is religious and historic city of Sri Anandpur Sahib where large number of tourists come to see the Virasat-e-Khalsa (Khalsa Heritage Memorial Complex) and also take part in Hola Mohalla festival. Kila Raipur Sports Festival is also popular tourist attraction in Kila Raipur near Ludhiana. Shahpur kandi fort, Ranjit Sagar lake and Sikh Temple in Sri Muktsar Sahib are also popular attractions in Punjab. Punjab also has the world's first museum based on the Indian Partition of 1947, in Amritsar, called the Partition Museum.

See also

Notes

References

Bibliography

 Radhika Chopra. Militant and Migrant: The Politics and Social History of Punjab (2011)
 Harnik Deol. Religion and Nationalism in India: The Case of the Punjab (Routledge Studies in the Modern History of Asia) (2000)
 Harjinder Singh Dilgeer, Encyclopedia of Jalandhar, Sikh University Press, Brussels, Belgium (2005)
 Harjinder Singh Dilgeer, SIKH HISTORY in 10 volumes, Sikh University Press, Brussels, Belgium (2010–11)
 J. S. Grewal. The Sikhs of the Punjab (The New Cambridge History of India) (1998)
 J. S. Grewal. Social and Cultural History of the Punjab: Prehistoric, Ancient and Early Medieval (2004)
 Nazer Singh. Delhi and Punjab: Essays in history and historiography (1995)
 Tai Yong Tan. The Garrison State: Military, Government and Society in Colonial Punjab, 1849–1947 (Sage Series in Modern Indian History) (2005)
 J. C. Aggarwal and S. P. Agrawal, eds. Modern History of Punjab: Relevant Select Documents (1992)
 R. M. Chopra, The Legacy of The Punjab, 1997, Punjabee Bradree, Calcutta.

External links

Government 
 
 Official Tourism Site of Punjab, India

General information
  
  
 
 

 

States and union territories of India
States and territories established in 1956
1956 establishments in India
Punjabi-speaking countries and territories